The 2014 Isle of Man TT Festival was held between Saturday 24 May and Friday 6 June 2014 on the 37.73-mile Isle of Man TT Mountain Course. The main races were six solo motorcycle races and two sidecar races.  The festival also included Pre-TT Classic Races held on 23, 24 & 26 May 2014 at the Billown Circuit in Castletown. Post-TT races scheduled for 7 June 2014 were cancelled by race organisers on safety grounds due to a thunderstorm and heavy overnight rain.

The 2014 TT Festival held a Lap of Honour of the Snaefell Mountain Course in memory of Simon Andrews who earlier had suffered a fatal crash during the 1000 cc Superstock event of the 2014 North West 200 races in May.

Practice Week
As with the 2013 Isle of Man TT races, the first part of the 2014 Practice Week was again dominated by inclement weather with the first evening session on Saturday 24 May cancelled due to heavy rain and mist on the Mountain Section of the course. The Tuesday evening practice was curtailed after an incident at Kerrowmoar with a sidecar outfit. The Wednesday session on the 28 May held in cloudy and overcast conditions was red-flagged due to an incident at Barregarrow after the solo competitors had completed only one lap. The rest of the Wednesday evening session was cancelled after rainfall returned to the northern sections of the Snaefell Mountain Course. The Sidecar class started the Thursday evening session before being red-flagged after 20 minutes due to a civilian medical emergency in the Quarterbridge area of Douglas. After the practice session was restarted, the start of the practice for solos was again delayed due to another incident with a sidecar outfit at Pinfold Cottage near Ramsey. In contrast, the Friday evening practice session was held in good weather and a number of solo competitors completing five laps of the Mountain Course.

Race Week
The blue ribbon event of the 2014 races, the Senior TT, was won by Michael Dunlop marking the 75th anniversary of the only solo TT race victory by a factory BMW Motorrad machine ridden by Georg Schorsch Meier during the 1939 500 cc Senior Isle of Man TT Race.

The 2014 TT races were again dominated by Michael Dunlop, repeating his 2013 IOM TT feat of winning four races within a week, riding a 1000 cc BMW in the Superbike TT and Superstock TT classes and a 600 cc Honda in Supersport TT Race 2. The 2014 Joey Dunlop TT Championship was won for the second consecutive year by Michael Dunlop with 116 points, with Bruce Anstey having 82 points and Dean Harrison in third place scoring 54 points. Michael Dunlop also scored a Junior/Senior TT double win during the 2014 TT Races raising his tally of Isle of Man TT race wins to 11 victories and 1 Classic TT win.

Gary Johnson won the Supersport TT Race 1 riding a three-cylinder 675 cc Triumph at an average race speed of 124.526 mph, the first victory by a British machine since Bruce Anstey, also on a Triumph, won the 2003 600 cc Junior TT Race. The 2014 TT Zero Race was won by John McGuinness at a race-average speed of 117.366 mph, raising his tally of Isle of Man TT race wins to 21, the first win in the TT electric motorcycle category for the Shinden San / Mugen factory team.

The Sidecar TT produced another maiden winner, with Race 1 being won by Conrad Harrison/Mike Aylott on a Shelbourne Honda 600 cc	outfit at a race-average speed of 113.987 mph. The Lightweight TT Race also produced another maiden winner in Dean Harrison, after race favourite and fastest in practice Ivan Lintin retired on lap 1 at Union Mills with an electrical problem. With his father Conrad Harrison winning the Sidecar Race 1 and Dean Harrison's Lightweight win this was the first occasion of father/son winners in different classes of during the same race week.

The Sidecar TT Race 2 was won by Dave Molyneux/Patrick Farrance riding a 600 cc DMR Kawasaki outfit at a race-average speed of 113.147 mph, raising his TT wins to 17. Molyneux also celebrated the 25th anniversary of his first win in the 1989 Isle of Man TT Sidecar Race 'A' with passenger Colin Hardman at an average race speed of 104.56 mph.

A new outright course lap record was set by Bruce Anstey, with a time of 17 minutes, 06.682 seconds at an average speed of 132.298 mph during lap 6 of the 2014 Superbike TT Race. A further race lap record was set by Michael Dunlop, recording a new class record for the Senior TT class of 17 minutes, 11.591 seconds, at an average speed of 131.668 mph. The Vernon Cooper Trophy for Fastest Newcomer was won by Peter Hickman, riding a 1000 cc BMW, during lap 6 of the Senior TT with a time of 17 minutes, 32.078 seconds at an average speed of 129.104 mph. After completing a number of practice laps, Mark Higgins broke his own car record for the Snaefell Mountain Course driving a 2015 Subaru WRX STI with a lap time of 19 minutes, 15.88 at an average speed of 117.510 miles per hour (189.114 km/h) 

A fatal accident to veteran Manx Grand Prix and TT competitor Bob Price occurred at Ballaugh Bridge during the Supersport TT Race 1. Former British Supersport champion Karl Harris crashed fatally at the 26th Milestone while competing in the Superstock TT Race.

Results

Practice times

Practice times and leaderboard Superbike/Senior TT
Plates; Black on white - black on yellow.

Practice times and leaderboard Supersport Junior TT
Plates; blue.

Practice times and leaderboard Superstock TT
Plates; red.

Practice times and leaderboard Lightweight TT
Plates; green.

Race results

2014 Superbike TT final standings.
31 May 2014 6 Laps (226.38 Miles) TT Mountain Course.

Fastest Lap and New Overall Course Record: Bruce Anstey –  (17' 06.682) on lap 6.

2014 Sidecar TT Race 1 TT final standings
31 May 2014 3 Laps (113.00 Miles) Mountain Course.

Fastest Lap: Dave Molyneux / Patrick Farrance –  (19' 35.612) on lap 2.

2014 Supersport Junior TT Race 1
2 June 2014 4 Laps (150.73 Miles) Mountain Course.

Fastest Lap: Gary Johnson –  (17' 51.711) on lap 2.

2014 Superstock TT final standings.
3 June 2014 4 Laps (150.73 Miles) Mountain Course.

Fastest Lap: Michael Dunlop –  (17' 26.621) on lap 2.

2014 TT Zero Race
4 June 2014 1 Lap (37.73 Miles) Mountain Course.

 (9 Starters)

Fastest Lap and New Race Record: John McGuinness –  (19' 17.366) on lap 1.

2014 Supersport Junior TT Race 2
4 June 2014 4 Laps (150.73 Miles) Mountain Course.

Fastest Lap: Michael Dunlop –  (17' 46.129) on lap 2.

2014 Sidecar TT Race 2 TT final standings
5 June 2014 3 Laps (113.00 Miles) Mountain Course.

Fastest Lap: Dave Molyneux / Patrick Farrance –  (19' 54.027) on lap 3.

2014 Lightweight TT 650cc Super-Twin
6 June 2014 3 Laps (113.00 Miles)

Fastest Lap: Keith Amor –  (19' 01.514) on lap 3.

2014 Senior TT final standings.
6 June 2014 6 Laps – (226.38 Miles) Mountain Course.

Fastest Lap and New Class Record: Michael Dunlop –  (17' 11.591) on lap 2.

See also
Manx Grand Prix
North West 200
Ulster Grand Prix

Sources

Isle of Man TT
2014 in British motorsport
2014 in motorcycle sport
2014